Kamieński Lagoon is a lagoon on the Oder River in north-western Poland. It is part of the Dziwna.

Both the lagoon and the Dziwna are part of Poland's internal waters.

Several settlements lie on the shores of the lagoon, notably (in order of population) Kamień Pomorski, Dziwnów, Międzywodzie, Wrzosowo and Dziwnówek. There are also three small villages on Chrząszczewska Island: Chrząszczewo, Chrząszczewko and Buniewice.

Until 1945, the lagoon was referred to by its German name of Camminer Bodden. In 1949, it officially became called Kamieński Zalew, and in 1991 the words in its name were reversed, its new name being Zalew Kamieński.

Gallery

Lagoons of Europe
Landforms of West Pomeranian Voivodeship
Bodies of water of Poland
Bays of the Baltic Sea
Kamień County